Carenum iridescens is a species of ground beetle in the subfamily Scaritinae. It was described by Sloane in 1894.

References

iridescens
Beetles described in 1894